Vladimir Stojković (born 4 October 1996) is a Portuguese professional footballer who plays for Saudi Arabian club Al-Okhdood Club as a goalkeeper.

Club career
Born in Leça da Palmeira, Matosinhos to a Serbian father, Stojković joined Sporting CP's youth system in 2007, aged 10. On 21 February 2016 he made his professional debut, appearing for the reserves in a 1–1 home draw against S.C. Freamunde in the Segunda Liga.

Stojković played with the newly created under-23 team in the 2018–19 season, following which he left the club. On 10 August 2019, he signed a one-year contract with G.D. Estoril Praia also of the Portuguese second division. Only used in the under-23s, on 1 September the next year he transferred to hometown side Leixões S.C. where he had begun playing football aged 7.

On 28 January 2021, free agent Stojković joined Académica de Coimbra also of the Portuguese second tier, on a five-month deal. On 5 July 2022, after his team's relegation, he agreed to a contract at Al-Okhdood Club in the Saudi First Division League.

International career
Stojković was capped once by Portugal at under-18 level. His appearance was a 2–0 win over the United States in Mafra on 8 June 2014.

Personal life
Stojković's father and uncle, respectively named Vladan and Vladimir, were also goalkeepers. Both spent several years in Portugal, and the latter was also a longtime Serbian international.

References

External links

Portuguese League profile 
National team data 

1996 births
Living people
Portuguese people of Serbian descent
Sportspeople from Matosinhos
Portuguese footballers
Association football goalkeepers
Liga Portugal 2 players
Sporting CP B players
G.D. Estoril Praia players
Leixões S.C. players
Associação Académica de Coimbra – O.A.F. players
Saudi First Division League players
Al-Okhdood Club players
Portugal youth international footballers
Portuguese expatriate footballers
Expatriate footballers in Saudi Arabia
Portuguese expatriate sportspeople in Saudi Arabia